Abu'l Hassan Ali ibn Ridwan Al-Misri (c. 988 - c. 1061) was an Arab of Egyptian origin who was a physician, astrologer and astronomer, born in Giza.

He was a commentator on ancient Greek medicine, and in particular on Galen; his commentary on Galen's Ars Parva was translated by Gerardo Cremonese. However, he is better known for providing the most detailed description of the supernova now known as SN 1006, the brightest stellar event in recorded history, which he observed in the year 1006. This was written in a commentary on Ptolemy's work Tetrabiblos.

He was later cited by European authors as Hali, Haly, or Haly Abenrudian. According to Alistair Cameron Crombie he also contributed to the theory of induction. He engaged in a celebrated polemic against another physician, Ibn Butlan of Baghdad.

Ali Ibn Ridwan is the likely inspiration for Ambrose Bierce's use of the name, Hali, in his short story, An Inhabitant of Carcosa. The name, Hali, was subsequently used by Robert W. Chambers and other authors of 'weird' horror fiction.

Works 
 A commentary on Ptolemy's Tetrabiblos (the pseudo-Ptolemaic Centiloquy and its commentary, which is sometimes attributed to Ali, is actually the work of Ahmad ibn Yusuf ibn al-Daya)
 De revolutionibus nativitatum (The Revolutions of Nativities), edited by Luca Gaurico, printed in Venice (1524)
 On the Prevention of Bodily Ills in Egypt: a treatise written to refute Ibn al-Jazzar's claim that Egypt was a very unhealthy place. Ibn Ridwan also argues that air (together with other environmental aspects) was fundamental to the health of a population.

References

External links

 History of Islamic Science
 2001 Columbia dissertation by Jennifer Ann Seymore The Life of Ibn Ridwan and his commentary of Ptolemy's Tetrabiblos; not open link
 
 
 

980s births
1061 deaths
People from Giza
Medieval Egyptian astrologers
Medieval Egyptian astronomers
Physicians from the Fatimid Caliphate
11th-century physicians
11th-century astrologers
11th-century Arabs